Skinny is another word for thin. It can also mean:

People
 Skinny (rapper), Saudi-American hip hop rapper
 Kyle Graham (1899–1973), American Major League Baseball pitcher
 Skinny Graham (outfielder) (1909–1967), American Major League Baseball player
 Skinny Johnson (1911–1980), American college basketball player
 Nedal Hussein (born 1977), Australian boxer
 Skinny O'Neal (1899–1981), American Major League Baseball pitcher
 Dominick Pizzonia (born 1941), New York mobster known as "Skinny Dom"
 Jack Titus (1908–1978), Australian rules football player
 Jonathan M. Wainwright (general) (1883–1953), American World War II army general and Medal of Honor recipient

Entertainment
 Skinny (band), defunct British electronica/rock band
 Skinny (They Can't Get Enough), 1988 album by rap group The Skinny Boys
 Skinny (novel), 2004 debut novel of Ibi Kaslik
 Skinny Pete, a character in the American TV series Breaking Bad
 Skinnies, an alien race in the science fiction novel Starship Troopers by Robert Heinlein

Other uses
 SKINNY (directing team)
 Skinny Client Control Protocol
 Skinny pig, a breed of hairless guinea pig
 Skinny, a technical trail feature found on some mountain biking trails
 Skinny Mobile, a subsidiary of Spark New Zealand

See also
 The Skinny (disambiguation)
 Skinny dip (disambiguation)
 Club Skinny, a mid-1990s nightclub which gave birth to the Romo movement

Lists of people by nickname